The 2018 EuroHockey Club Champions Cup was the 46th edition of the premier European competition for women's field hockey clubs. HC Den Bosch were the defending champions, having won their 15th title in the 2017 EuroHockey Club Champions Cup. The tournament itook place from 17 to 20 May. Eight teams from six countries participated in the tournament.

Teams

  Victorya Smolevichi
  Surbiton
  Hamburg
  Mannheimer
  UCD
  Amsterdam
  Den Bosch
  Club de Campo

Results

Bracket

Quarter-finals

Fifth to eighth place classification

Crossover

Seventh and eighth place

Fifth and sixth place

First to fourth place classification

Semi-finals

Third place

Final

Final ranking

References

External links
 Altius RT - Eurohockey - Tournament results and statistics

2018
2018 in women's field hockey
2018 in English women's sport
International women's field hockey competitions hosted by England
May 2018 sports events in Europe
2018 EuroHockey Club Champions Cup
2017–18 in European field hockey